Petras is a masculine given name. It is a cognate of Peter, which is derived from the Greek word "petros" meaning "stone, rock". People with the give name Petras include:
Petras Auštrevičius (born 1963), Lithuanian politician, diplomat, civil servant
Petras Balocka (born 1986), Lithuanian basketball player
Petras Ciunis (1898–1979), Lithuanian army officer, educator
Petras Cvirka (1909–1947), Lithuanian author 
Petras Dirgėla (born 1947), Lithuanian author
Petras Geniušas (born 1961), Lithuanian classical pianist
Petras Giniotas (born 1952), Lithuanian politician
Petras Griškevičius (1924-1987), Lithuanian-Soviet politician 
Petras Kalpokas (1880–1945), Lithuanian painter and educator
Petras Karla (1937–1969), Lithuanian rower and Olympic competitor
Petras Klimas (1891–1969), Lithuanian diplomat, author and historian
Petras Kubiliūnas (1894–1946), Lithuanian military officer and politician
Petras Kunca (born 1942), Lithuanian violinist
Petras Mantigirdaitis (died 1459), nobleman of the Grand Duchy of Lithuania and Grand Marshal of Lithuania
Petras Jonaitis Mantigirdaitis (died c.1497), nobleman of the Grand Duchy of Lithuania
Petras Poškus (born 1935), Lithuanian politician
Petras Raslanas (born 1914), Lithuanian communist activist, politician and fugitive
Petras Repšys (born 1940) Lithuanian artist
Petras Rimša (1881–1961), Lithuanian sculptor 
Petras Šiurskas (born 1953), Lithuanian sprint canoer
Petras Stankeras (born 1948), Lithuanian historian
Petras Vaitiekūnas (born 1953), Lithuanian politician, former Foreign Minister of Lithuania
Petras Vileišis (1851–1926), Lithuanian engineer, political activist and philanthropist

See also
Petras (surname)

References

Lithuanian masculine given names